Neohahnia is a genus of dwarf sheet spiders that was first described by Cândido Firmino de Mello-Leitão in 1917.

Species
 it contains four species:
Neohahnia chibcha Heimer & Müller, 1988 – Colombia
Neohahnia ernsti (Simon, 1898) – St. Vincent, Venezuela
Neohahnia palmicola Mello-Leitão, 1917 – Brazil
Neohahnia sylviae Mello-Leitão, 1917 (type) – Brazil

References

Araneomorphae genera
Hahniidae
Spiders of South America
Taxa named by Cândido Firmino de Mello-Leitão